Complete Rarities: I.R.S. 1982–1987 is a 2014 compilation album featuring songs released by alternative rock band R.E.M. during their time on I.R.S. Records. In addition to the band's I.R.S. material, this album also features the tracks from the band's first single, which was released in July 1981 on the Hib-Tone label.

There was no CD release. The songs are digital download only.

Track listing
All songs written by Bill Berry, Peter Buck, Mike Mills and Michael Stipe except as indicated.
"Radio Free Europe" (Original Hib-Tone single A-Side) – 3:48
"Sitting Still" (Original Hib-Tone single B-side) – 3:16
"White Tornado" (single B-side) – 1:56
"Gardening at Night" (Different Vocal Mix) – 3:30
"Gardening at Night" (Acoustic) – 3:54
"All the Right Friends" – 3:54
"Moon River" (Johnny Mercer) – 2:21
"Pretty Persuasion"  – 4:02
"There She Goes Again" (Lou Reed) (single B-side)  – 2:49
"Tighten Up" (Archie Bell, Billy Buttier) – 4:09
"Ages of You" (Live) – 3:48
"We Walk" (Live) – 3:17
"1,000,000" (Live) (12" B-side) – 3:26
"Gardening at Night" (Electric Demo) – 4:44
"Just a Touch" – 2:38
"King of the Road" (Roger Miller) (single B-side) – 3:14
"Pale Blue Eyes" (Reed) (single B-side) – 2:54
"Voice of Harold" (single B-side) – 4:25
"Walters Theme" (single B-side) – 1:32
"White Tornado (single B-side)" – 1:52
"Windout" (Jerry Ayers, Berry, Buck, Mills, Stipe) – 1:49
"Wind Out" (With Friends) (Ayers, Berry, Buck, Mills, Stipe)  – 2:00
"9–9" (Live) – 3:06
"Gardening at Night" (Live) (12" B-side) – 3:48
"Catapult" (Live) (single B-side) – 4:03
"Ages of You" – 3:43
"Bandwagon" (Berry, Buck, Mills, Lynda Stipe, M. Stipe) (single B-side) – 2:17
"Burning Down" (single B-side) – 4:12
"Burning Hell" (12" B-side) – 3:49
"Crazy" (Randy Bewley, Vanessa Briscoe, Curtis Crowe, Michael Lachowski) (single B-side) – 3:03
"Driver 8" (Live) (12" B-side) – 3:30
"Bad Day" – 3:03
"Femme Fatale" (Reed) (12" B-side) – 2:50
"Hyena" (Demo) – 2:49
"Mystery to Me" (Demo) – 2:01
"Rotary Ten" (single B-side) – 2:01
"Theme from Two Steps Onward" (Demo) – 4:37
"Tired of Singing Trouble" – 0:59
"Toys in the Attic" (Steven Tyler, Joe Perry) (12" B-side) – 2:28
"Romance" – 3:27
"Last Date" (12" B-side) – 2:16
"Finest Worksong" (Lengthy Club Mix) (12" B-side) – 5:52
"Finest Worksong" (Mutual Drum Horn Mix) (single A-side) – 3:51
"Finest Worksong" (Other Mix) (12" B-side) – 3:46
"Maps and Legends" (Live) (single B-side) – 3:16
"Disturbance at the Heron House" (Live) (12" B-side) – 3:26
"The One I Love" (Live) (single B-side) – 4:06
"Swan Swan H" (Acoustic) – 2:42
"(All I Have to Do Is) Dream" (Felice and Boudleaux Bryant) – 2:38
"Time After Time Etc." (Includes excerpts from "So. Central Rain" and "Red Rain" by Peter Gabriel) (Live) (Berry, Buck, Mills, Stipe, Gabriel) (single B-side) – 8:22

References

2014 compilation albums
Albums produced by Don Dixon (musician)
Albums produced by Don Gehman
Albums produced by Joe Boyd
Albums produced by Mitch Easter
Albums produced by Scott Litt
EMI Records compilation albums
R.E.M. compilation albums
B-side compilation albums